The Ear is a Czech language film by Karel Kachyňa, completed in 1970. This film was banned by the nation's ruling Communist party (who were supported by the occupying Soviet forces). It wasn't released until the fall of the communist regime in 1989.

Plot
The film is about a bitter married couple that consists of Ludvík, a senior official of Prague's ruling Communist regime, and his alcoholic wife Anna.  They return home after attending a political party dinner and notice their home has been broken into.  Several strange occurrences, including the disappearance of their spare house keys and dead phone lines, lead them to believe that they are under surveillance by their own government.  As the night progresses, the flaws of their marriage and of each other are exposed.

Cast
 Radoslav Brzobohatý as Ludvík
 Jiřina Bohdalová as Anna
 Jiří Císler as Standa
 Miroslav Holub as Russian general
 Milica Kolofiková as Woman at the party
 Jaroslav Moučka as Vagera

Awards
1990 Cannes Film Festival - Nominated for the Golden Palm for Karel Kachyňa.

See also
 Honey Night (2015)

Book
 Ear, Karolinum Press, 2022. .

References

External links

Ucho reviewed in Seattle Weekly By N.P. Thompson

1970 films
Czechoslovak black-and-white films
1970s Czech-language films
1970 drama films
Films directed by Karel Kachyňa
Films about security and surveillance
Golden Kingfisher winners
Czech thriller films
1970s Czech films
Czechoslovak thriller films
Czech psychological drama films